Elizabeth Grace Anton (born 12 December 1998) has represented New Zealand in association football at international level.

Anton  was born in Auckland, New Zealand in 1998.

Anton was a member of the New Zealand U-17 side at the 2014 FIFA U-17 Women's World Cup in Costa Rica, the 2016 FIFA U-20 Women's World Cup in Papua New Guinea, and again at the 2018 FIFA U-20 Women's World Cup in France.

Anton made her senior début as a substitute in a 5–0 win over Thailand on 28 November 2017.

References

Living people
1998 births
Women's association football midfielders
Association footballers from Auckland
New Zealand women's association footballers
New Zealand women's international footballers
Perth Glory FC (A-League Women) players
Footballers at the 2020 Summer Olympics
Olympic association footballers of New Zealand
New Zealand expatriate sportspeople in Australia
New Zealand expatriate women's association footballers
Expatriate women's soccer players in Australia